Fútbol Club Player Villafuerte (sometimes referred as Player Villafuerte) is a Peruvian football club, playing in the city of Huanta, Ayacucho, Peru.

History
The Fútbol Club Player Villafuerte was founded on April 14, 2011.

In 2014 Copa Perú, the club classified to the National Stage, but was eliminated by Sport Águila in the 16th round.

In 2015 Copa Perú, the club classified to the National Stage, but was eliminated when it finished in the 38th place.

In 2017 Copa Perú, the club classified to the National Stage, but was eliminated when it finished in the 33rd place.

In 2018 Copa Perú, the club classified to the Departmental Stage, but was eliminated by San Cristóbal in the semifinals.

Rivalries
Player Villafuerte has had a long-standing rivalry with local club Sport Huanta. The rivalry between Villafuerte and Huanta known as the Clásico Huantino.

Honours

Regional
Región VI:
Runner-up (1): 2014

Liga Departamental de Ayacucho:
Winners (2): 2014, 2015
Runner-up (1): 2017

Liga Provincial de Huanta:
Winners (4): 2014, 2015, 2017, 2019
Runner-up (1): 2018, 2022

Liga Distrital de Huanta:
Winners (4): 2014, 2017, 2018, 2019
Runner-up (1): 2022

See also
List of football clubs in Peru
Peruvian football league system

References

External links
 

Football clubs in Peru
Association football clubs established in 2011
2011 establishments in Peru